SAP is a German multinational enterprise-software company.

SAP may also refer to:

Biology and medicine
 Serum amyloid P component, the serum form of a human protein that forms amyloids
 Shrimp alkaline phosphatase, an enzyme used in research
 SLAM-associated protein, a signaling lymphocytic activation molecule
 Select Agent Program of the CDC to regulate select agents in the US

Business
 SAP Ariba, a US subsidiary of SAP
 Sayers, Allport & Potter, an Australian rodent poison manufacturer
  (1902–1920), a French automobile manufacturer

Computing and telecommunication
 SAP (file format), a file format for playing back Atari 8-bit music
 SAP ERP, business data software by SAP SE
 Second audio program
 Service Access Point
 Service Advertising Protocol
 Session Announcement Protocol
 SIM Access Profile, a Bluetooth connectivity profile
 Symbolic Assembly Program
 Stable abstractions principle
Simple-As-Possible, a computer architecture designed for educational purposes

Law and government
 SAP scale (2002–2014) used to categorise indecent images of children in England and Wales
 Simplified Acquisition Procedures, streamlined procedures for government procurement in the United States
 Social amelioration program, cash aid by the Philippine government
 South African Police (1913–1994)
 Special access program, for U.S. secret information
 Special Assistance Plan, an academic programme in Singapore
 Stabilisation and Association Process of the EU, for prospective new members
 Structural Adjustment Program of the International Monetary Fund

Political parties
 Revolutionary Communist League (Belgium) or 
 Socialist Alternative Politics, a socialist political party in the Netherlands
 Socialist Workers Party (Denmark) or 
 South African Party (1911–1934)
 Swedish Social Democratic Party or

Other uses
 Self-avoiding polygon
 Semi-Armour Piercing, a type of rocket or cannon round.
 Space allocation problem
 Standard Assessment Procedure
 Strong anthropic principle
 Superabsorbent polymer
 Ramón Villeda Morales International Airport's IATA code

See also
 SAP Arena, a multi-purpose arena in Mannheim, Germany
 SAP Center, an multi-purpose arena in San Jose, California
 SAP Open, a US-based tennis tournament, also known as the Pacific Coast Championships
 Sap (disambiguation)
 SAPS (disambiguation)